Stavros Ditsios (Greek: Σταύρος Δίτσιος, born 31 March 1978) is a Greek visual artist, known for abstract paintings and sculpture.   He studied as a painter at the Academy of Fine Arts in Florence, Italy, from 1997 until 2001.  Ditsios now lives and works in Thessaloniki, Greece.

Personal life 
Stavros Ditsios was born in Thessaloniki, Greece, where he grew up, and went to school in Panorama, Thessaloniki. His father was a merchant. At the age of seven, Ditsios took first prize in an exhibition for young artists in Y.M.C.A of Panorama, Thessaloniki.   His parents organized a solo exhibition of his paintings in the back yard of his house, and his school also organized a solo exhibition for him. After finishing school he studied line drawing as preparation for the Fine Arts Academy in Florence. In 1996 he went to Siena in Italy to study Italian language. After passing the exams in 1997, he studied at the Academy of Fine Arts, where Professor Umberto Borella was among his tutors.

Ditsios married a ballet teacher, Eva Fevgidou, in 2012, and they have a daughter.

Early career 
While he was studying in Florence, Ditsios introduced his own technique called “Vavoura” (confusion).   Ditsios unsuccessfully attempted to demonstrate this outside the Uffizi Museum by offering tourists to draw on a 4x1 height canvas. While in Florence, he got engaged with music and he produced his own colour palette that corresponded to music notes inspired by Wassily Kandinskyy. After music, he began writing poetry.  After finishing his studies, he moved to Thessaloniki, Greece, where he opened his own studio and began working in the family business of lighting equipment as a light designer.

Art 

Distio's work reflects mostly in an abstract expression all the sensual impressions around our daily life, be it sounds or philosophical ideas. In a world of constantly rising amount of sounds, pictures, videos and news he catches those moments in his art to allow to freeze it in time and space and to reach a moment of peace and calmness. “Vavoura” (confusion) of all the various sounds  do accumulate to one new standstill sound on the canvas. Ditsio's approached his Vavoura concept in a set of series

Exhibitions

Solo exhibitions 
Cultural Centre, Thessaloniki, town hall Panorama on 12 December 2015
 Vilka Gallery, Thessaloniki, 2010
 Artower Agora Gallery, Athens, 2002

Group exhibitions 
 Art is Hard, Harbour, Warehouse 9, Thessaloniki 2013
 Art is Hard, Harbour, Warehouse 7, Thessaloniki 2012
 Harbour, Warehouse C’, Thessaloniki, 2011
 Harbour, Warehouse C’, Thessaloniki, 2010
 Artists Exhibition, Block 33, Thessaloniki, 2009
 Artists International Meeting, Biennale 2, Thessaloniki, 2009
 International Art Festival, Chania, Crete, 2004
 Cultural Center of the Municipality of Koridallos, Athens, 2003
 Exhibition for the Anti-Cancer Donation, Hotel Nefeli, Thessaloniki, 2002
 Artower Agora Gallery, Athens, 2002
 Graduate Exhibition, Florence, Italy, 2001
 Italian Students Exhibition, Torino, 2000
 Group Exhibition of the Academy of Fine Arts, Florence, Italy, 1999
Ditsios paintings are exhibited in the museum of Vorre in Athens, in the Greek ministries of Justice and Internal Affairs, and in private collections (mainly Greece, Spain and Germany).
Art of redemption, Haegeumgang Theme Museum, Geoje, South Korea

References

External links 

The Artists Webpage: http://www.stavrosditsios.com/

Chamber of fine Arts, Greece 

CONTEMPORARY ART CURATOR ARTIST DIRECTORY 

1978 births
Living people
Greek artists
Artists from Thessaloniki